The 1998 Thomas & Uber Cup was the 20th tournament of the Thomas Cup, and the 17th tournament of the Uber Cup, which are the major international team competitions in world badminton.

Host city selection
China was originally selected as the host, with Shanghai as the competition site. IBF later moved the competition to Hong Kong due to sponsorship issues which preferred Hong Kong over Shanghai.

Thomas Cup

Teams
49 teams took part in the competition, and eight teams qualified for the final Stage, including Indonesia, as defending champion, and Hong Kong, as host team. 1998 Thomas Cup is considered one of the greatest Thomas Cup competitions because the score difference of the games is very close and the games are played tightly.

Final stage

Group A

Matchday 1

Matchday 2

Matchday 3

Group B

Knockout stage

Semi-final

Final

Uber Cup

Teams
40 teams took part in the competition, and eight teams qualified for the final Stage.

Final stage

Group A

Group B

Knockout stage

Semi-finals

Final

References

Smash: 1998 Thomas Cup - Final Round
Smash: 1998 Uber Cup - Final Round

Thomas & Uber Cup
Thomas Uber Cup
Thomas Uber Cup
Badminton tournaments in Hong Kong
Badminton in Hong Kong
1998 in Hong Kong sport